Space Museum is the sole studio album by British minimal wave band Solid Space. It was released in 1982 by In Phaze Records through cassette, eventually becoming a rarity. It was produced by the record label's owner Pat Bermingham.

The album's sound has been described as "cold, disconnected, minimal synth-pop full of eerie moods and bizarre melodies." It features lyrics inspired by science fiction novels and television programs, in particular the popular shows Doctor Who and Captain Scarlet and the Mysterons, and often deal with traveling through the galaxy, "delivered in a robotic deadpan vocals." Tracks such as "A Darkness In My Soul" (inspired by the Dean Koontz novel of the same name), "Destination Moon" (based on The Adventures of Tintin novel of the same name), and "Tenth Planet" were also considered as "dark, atmospheric and atypical", because they feature guitar along with synthesizers and drum machines.

The album was named number 2 on Fact magazine's list of "The 20 best Minimal Wave records ever made". The cover art is taken from a publicity still from the Doctor Who serial "The Wheel in Space". Two song titles on the album, also reference Doctor Who serials: "The Tenth Planet" and "Earthshock", which like "The Wheel in Space", also feature the Cybermen.

On 10 December 2017, a remastered version of Space Museum was released by the label Dark Entries. It is the first legitimate reissue of the album on vinyl, having been supervised and approved by the members of Solid Space, and was designed to curb the amount of bootleg copies that have circulated since its release. The LP expands the original tracklisting to feature two bonus tracks - a cover of "Tutti Lo Sanno" by Marine Girls, and "Platform 6" by the band's original incarnation, Exhibit A - plus a 11x11 double sided insert with lyrics, notes, and never-seen-before photographs of the group, as well as a postcard replica of the album's original advert.

Track listing

All songs written by Dan Goldstein and Matthew Vosburgh, except where noted.

Personnel 
 Dan Goldstein – keyboards, vocals, lyrics (tracks 3, 5-8, 10, 11) 
 Matthew Vosburgh – guitar, bass, keyboards, vocals, lyrics (track 2)
 Jonathan "Jon Winegum" Weinreich – saxophone (track 5), clarinet (track 10)
 Pat Bermingham – production

References

External links
 

1982 debut albums
Solid Space albums
Music based on Doctor Who